Il ratto della sposa (The Kidnapped Fiancée) is an opera buffa  in three acts by Pietro Alessandro Guglielmi. The Italian libretto was by Gaetano Martinelli.

Performance history
It was first performed at the Teatro San Moisè in Venice in the autumn of 1765. A revised version  was staged in London in 1768. The opera was successful and there were productions in succeeding decades, some entitled Lo sposo rapita or Il vecchio deluso.

Roles

References
Hunter, Mary (1992), 'Ratto della sposa, ll' in The New Grove Dictionary of Opera, ed. Stanley Sadie (London) 

Operas
Italian-language operas
Opera buffa
Operas by Pietro Alessandro Guglielmi
1765 operas